USS Cardinal (AM-6) was a  in the United States Navy. She was named after the cardinal bird.

Cardinal was launched 29 March 1918 by Staten Island Shipbuilding Co., New York; sponsored by Ms. I. Nelson; and commissioned on 23 August 1918 as Minesweeper No.6.

History

East Coast operations
Cardinal served in the 3rd Naval District, sweeping waters off New York and serving as a temporary lightship, until 3 August 1919, when she sailed to join the Pacific Fleet.

Pacific Ocean deployment
For the next three years, she sailed out of San Diego and San Diego, California, carrying supplies, provisions and passengers along the California coast, and towing lighters, targets, and disabled ships. Cardinal was redesignated as AM-6 on 17 July 1920.

From 8 February – 16 April 1923, Cardinal sailed to the Panama Canal to provide tug services during fleet battle practice. She returned to San Pedro to prepare for duty in Alaskan waters, and on 23 May sailed for Port Angeles, Washington, where she called from 30 May – 1 June.

Fate
While bound for Dutch Harbor on 6 June, she was grounded on a reef off the east coast of Chirikof Island, and heavy flooding began immediately. Some of her men were landed on the island, where they were later taken off by a United States Coast and Geodetic Survey ship. The rest were rescued from the battered Cardinal on 7 June by the oiler , who also took off salvageable material and stores. The remaining hulk sank soon thereafter.

References

External links

USS Cardinal AM-6 
From Dictionary of American Fighting Ships

 

Lapwing-class minesweepers
Ships built in Staten Island
Shipwrecks in the Pacific Ocean
Maritime incidents in June 1923
1918 ships
World War I minesweepers of the United States